Eugene Fruehauf (November 1, 1912 – September 13, 1998) was an American rower. He competed in the men's coxless four at the 1936 Summer Olympics.

References

External links
 

1912 births
1998 deaths
American male rowers
Olympic rowers of the United States
Rowers at the 1936 Summer Olympics
Rowers from Buffalo, New York